Frog Hill View Point is a tourist spot in Gudalur, Nilgiris, Tamil Nadu. It is about 12 km from Gudalur on the way of Gudalur-Ooty road.

See also
 Mudumalai Wildlife Sanctuary
 Gudalur
 Pykara
 Needle Rock View Point

References

Tourist attractions in Nilgiris district